Kailan Sasabihing Mahal Kita  is a 1985 Philippine drama film directed by actor Eddie Garcia.

Plot 
Arra (Sharon Cuneta) is a young woman involved in a scandal with her ex-boyfriend. She was arranged to marry an older man, but close family friend Jake (Christopher De Leon) takes responsibility and enters into a marriage of convenience with Arra, instead. Romance blossomed within the pretend-marriage, but Jake’s girlfriend (Cherie Gil) comes back into the scene to express disagreement with the setup.

Cast 
 Christopher De Leon as Jake Abelardo
 Sharon Cuneta as Arra Sevilla
 Eddie Rodriguez as Bob Sevilla
 Cherie Gil as Arianne Velez
 Armida Siguion-Reyna as Donya Amelia Abelardo
 Joel Alano as Henri Ortiz
 Liza Lorena as Mila Sevilla
 Vic Diaz as Romy de Gracia
 Romy Rivera as Ben Ortiz
 Delia Razon as Meding Ortiz
 Deborah Sun as Sandra Velez
 Encar Benedicto as Carol Velez
 Paraluman as Luz Tuazon
 Virgie Montes as Auntie Teresing

Production and Release 
The movie was produced by Viva films and was released on 26 November 1985.

References